George Hare Leonard (30 January 1863 – 31 January 1941) was the Henry Overton Wills Professor of Modern History at the University of Bristol from 1905 to 1928.

He was born in Clifton, Gloucestershire, England the second son of George Hare Leonard, JP  (1826–1913) and Eliza Berry ‘Leila’ née Everett (1835–1925). Educated at Clevedon and Mill Hill Schools, and Clare College, Cambridge - BA 1884 (History Tripos 1st Class); MA 1888.

He was a Lecturer for the Cambridge Extension Lectures Syndicate from 1884–1891, and the first to lecture in Cambridge.

He was the first Warden of the Broad Plain House Settlement, Bristol from 1891 - 1900. Lecturer at University College, Bristol, in History and Literature, 1901.

He was active in the worker's education movement; Chairman of the Worker's Education Association in Bristol and the West.

He died in 1941 at Barnwood House Hospital in Gloucester.

After his death, his widow and second cousin - Mary Leonard née Warren (1868–1928) - endowed the “George Hare Leonard Prize” at the University of Bristol, given for the best overall performance in Part II examinations in History; and the “George Hare Leonard Memorial Lecture”

Works

 He wrote the lyrics for “It is the day of all the year”, a carol for Mothering Sunday set to a Mediaeval tune and included in the 1928 edition of Oxford Book of Carols

References 

1863 births
1941 deaths
British historians